Barlow (Horner's Mill during the Civil War) is a populated place between the Gettysburg Battlefield and the Mason–Dixon line in Adams County, Pennsylvania, United States, situated at the intersection of Rock Creek and Pennsylvania Route 134.  North of the creek on the road summit is the principal facility of the rural community: the 1939 community hall at the Barlow Volunteer Fire Company fire station.  The hall is a Cumberland Township polling place and was used by Mamie and Dwight D. Eisenhower after purchasing their nearby farm (President Eisenhower became an honorary company member in 1955).  Horner's Mill was the site of an 1861 Union Civil War encampment, and the covered bridge was used by the II Corps and General George G. Meade en route to the 1863 Battle of Gettysburg.

Barlow is located near the U.S. Route 15 interchange to the north and has three Taneytown Rd intersections, with the Barlow-Greenmount, Barlow, and Barlow-Two Taverns roads.  South of the community is a site listed on the National Register of Historic Places (Spangler-Benner Farm) near the  Mount Joy Lutheran Church and cemetery. The neighboring communities of Barlow are Greenmount 2.9 mi to the west, Round Top 3.3 mi to the north, Two Taverns 5.1 mi to the east, Harney, Maryland 3.1 mi to the south, and Fairplay 3.2 miles to the southwest.

References

1890 establishments in Pennsylvania
One-room schoolhouses in Pennsylvania
Populated places established in 1787
Unincorporated communities in Adams County, Pennsylvania
American Civil War sites
Pennsylvania in the American Civil War
Unincorporated communities in Pennsylvania